Reina Reech (born Reina Cristina Maurín Lasausse; 19 February 1958) is an Austrian Argentine actress, dancer, singer, choreographer, producer, and creative director. She is a naturalised Argentine and is a known Argentine vedette.

Career 
Reina Reech studied classical dance, but the field started in show business as a dancer revue. Over the years became a showgirl in various "magazines" in Buenos Aires. In film-starred in seven films from Argentina, but always in supporting roles during the 80's.

101 Dalmatians in 1999 was on stage, playing the role of the villainous Cruella de Vil, with great success and great performance. Since 2000 was an actress and choreographer in several musicals and revue. On television children's program led the Queen's Colours.

Filmography
 ¡Yo También Tengo Fiaca! (1978)
 Expertos En Pinchazos (1979)
 Las Muñecas Que Hacen ¡Pum! (1979)
 El Poder De La Censura (1983)
 Todo o Nada (1984)
 Los Gatos (Prostitución De Alto Nivel) (1985)
 Las Minas De Salomón Rey (1986)
 102 Dalmatians (2000)... Spanish dubbing at Cruella de Vil

Television

TV Producer

TV Other appearances

Theatre

Theatre Producer
 Inolvidable (2006)
 Irresistible (2007)
 Incomparable (2008)
 Deslumbrante (2009)
 La revista de Buenos Aires (2010)

Discography
 Reina En Colores (1993)
 Reina Y Su Muñeca En Colores (1993)
 Bailando En Colores (1994)
 Yo Soy Colores (1995)
 Lo Mejor De Colores (1995)
 La Familia De Colores (1996)
 Esencia Infinita (1998)
 Esto Es Barbaro – Grandes Exitos (1999)
 101 Dálmatas (2000)

Producer Discography
 Cuentos Mágicos De Doña Araña (1994)
 Miau Miau – El Gato Montés (1995)
 Caramelito Y Vos (1999)
 Scratch 8 (2003)

Videography
 Reina En Colores – Todos Los Musicales De La Tele (1993)
 Reina Y Su Muñeca En Colores (1994)
 Colores En El Mar (1995)

References

External links 
 

1952 births
Living people
Actors from Vienna
Citizens of Argentina through descent
People from Buenos Aires
Argentine film actresses
Argentine stage actresses
Argentine television actresses
Argentine television personalities
Women television personalities
Argentine female dancers
Argentine vedettes
Argentine musical theatre creative directors
Argentine musical theatre directors
Argentine musical theatre choreographers
Argentine musical theatre producers
Argentine musical theatre female dancers
Argentine musical theatre actresses
Argentine musical theatre women singers
Bailando por un Sueño (Argentine TV series) judges